Krofne (Albanian and ; Bosnian and , ;) are airy filled doughnuts. They are round and usually filled with jelly, marmalade, jam or chocolate as well as butter, Nutella and cinnamon. They can also be filled with custard, or cream, but that is usually less common. The name comes from German Krapfen, and it is a variation of the Central European pastry known as the Berliner. They are also similar to beignets.

The recipe for homemade krofne includes yeast, milk, sugar, flour, salt, butter, eggs, rum, lemon peel, marmalade and powdered sugar. The dough is kneaded and prepared and then cut into small pieces, then made into a little ball, making it easier to cook.

In Croatia and Slovenia, the consumption of krofne, or krofi, increases significantly during the yearly winter festival of Carnival. In Croatia, they are served on New Year's Day as a good-luck token as well as for prosperity., as well as for other holidays such as Easter, Christmas and Thanksgiving .

Gallery

See also
 List of doughnut varieties
 Jelly doughnut
 List of custard desserts

References

External links

 Krofne: video recipe
 Recepti i Kuvar online, krofne recepti


Albanian cuisine
Bosnia and Herzegovina cuisine
Croatian cuisine
Montenegrin cuisine
Serbian cuisine
Slovenian cuisine
Doughnuts
Custard desserts
Slovenian desserts
Croatian desserts

hr:Pokladnica
it:Krapfen
sr:Крофна